Brickell Heights are two twin towers in the Brickell neighborhood of Miami, Florida. Together, the towers have 690 units with a ground floor Equinox Gym. Ground for the towers was broken in 2014 following the groundbreaking of SLS Brickell.The project was originally announced as The Premiere Towers during the 2000s' building boom but was cancelled due to financial reasons caused by the Great Recession. The project was re-announced by Related in October 2013 as Brickell Heights. A third tower, SLS Lux, is across Miami Avenue to the east. The site is about one block north of the Tenth Street Metromover Station. The project is directly adjacent on the east side of a 1980s office building, the Brickell Bayview Center, which is now nearly surrounded by high rises.

See also
 List of tallest buildings in Miami

References

Other
Official Site
Premiere Towers from Emporis

Residential skyscrapers in Miami
2017 establishments in Florida
Residential buildings completed in 2017
Residential condominiums in Miami
Twin towers